Pablo de Olavide is a station of the Seville Metro on line 1 named after the nearby Universidad Pablo de Olavide. This station will also be a tram stop for the Alcalá de Guadaíra tram line that is under construction and projected to be completed in 2019.
It is located at the outskirts of the city within the University Campus, close to Utrera road. Pablo de Olavide is an elevated building, situated between Guadaíra and Condequinto stations on the same line. It was opened on April 2, 2009.

See also
 List of Seville metro stations

References

External links 
  Official site.
 History, construction details and maps.

Seville Metro stations
Railway stations in Spain opened in 2009